The Statutes of Lithuania, originally known as the Statutes of the Grand Duchy of Lithuania, were a 16th-century codification of all the legislation of the Grand Duchy of Lithuania and its successor, the Polish–Lithuanian Commonwealth. The Statutes consist of three legal codes (1529, 1566 and 1588), all written in Ruthenian language, translated into Latin and later Polish. They formed the basis of the legal system of the Grand Duchy and were "the first full code of laws written in Europe since Roman Law". The Statutes evolved hand-in-hand with the Lithuanian expansion to Slavic lands, thus the main sources of the statutes were Old Lithuanian Customary law, Old Slavic customary law, as well as the Nobility privileges in Poland, Magdeburg Rights, international treaties and royal charters and proclamations of the 12th – 14th centuries.

First and Second Statutes

The main purpose of the First Statute was to standardise and unify the law, under one legal code, ending the prominent regional particularism. The unified law was supposed to act as a tool for better political and economic integration of the different regions.

The First Statute was drafted in 1522 and came into force in 1529 by the initiative of the Lithuanian Council of Lords. It has been proposed that the codification was initiated by Grand Chancellor of Lithuania Mikołaj Radziwiłł as a reworking and expansion of the Casimir Code. The First Statute consisted of 13 Chapters and was divided into 282 Articles. The first edition was redrafted and completed by his successor Albertas Goštautas, who assumed the position of the Grand Chancellor of Lithuania in 1522.

The First Statute was hand-written and survived in several copies. Statutes of Lithuania were translated to Latin because of its superior terminology and to avoid ambiguity. Augustinus Rotundus was the most active proponent of Latin usage in the GDL.

The second statute came into effect in 1566 by the order of the King of Poland and Grand Duke of Lithuania, Sigismund II Augustus, and was larger and more advanced. The Grand Duke did this because of pressure from the Lithuanian nobility, as the expansion of nobles' rights since the publication of the first statute had made it redundant. The second statute was prepared by a special commission, consisting of ten members, appointed by the Grand Duke and the Council of Lords.

This Second Statute made the rights of Orthodox Christians and Catholics equal. It consisted of 14 Chapters and contained 367 Articles.

Third Statute

The Third Statute, described as an "outstanding monument of the legal, literary and linguistic culture", was accepted in 1588 in response to the Union of Lublin, which created the Polish–Lithuanian Commonwealth. The main author and editor of this statute was the great Chancellor of Lithuania Lew Sapieha of Ruthenian origin. The statute was the first one to be printed (in contrast to the handwritten statutes before) in Ruthenian language using Cyrillic alphabet. Translations of the statute were printed in Muscovia and also in Poland, where at that time laws were not thoroughly codified and the Lithuanian statute was consulted in some cases where the corresponding or comparably similar Polish laws were unclear or missing.

The statute reorganized and modified existing law, and also included new laws. Novel features included a tendency toward severe penalties, including capital punishment, which was in line with the general reactionary retributive trend in contemporary European law (cf. Malleus Maleficarum). The statute also provided that crimes committed by or against people from different social ranks were punished alike, following the idea of equal worth of human life. Yet the hurdles for a peasant to have a noble tried and convicted were higher than the other way around. The statute was supported by Lithuanian magnates, as it granted them special powers and privileges allowing them to keep the lesser Lithuanian nobility and peasants in check. As a token for being acknowledged as Grand Duke of Lithuania, Sigismund III Vasa revised the Union of Lublin and approved the Third Lithuanian Statute.

Many features of the statute were not in line with the provisions of the Union of Lublin, which is not at all mentioned in the statute. The third article of the Statute provided that all lands of the Grand Duchy of Lithuania will be eternally within the Grand Duchy of Lithuania and never become part of other states. In this category fall e.g. the provisions about distributing local offices only to native people (or to people who had bought that status). So, too, do the many, detailed provisions about the Lithuanian estates' assemblies which eventually were abolished by the Lublin union treaty. Thus, in everyday legal practice, the statute trumped and even usurped the union treaty.

A group often opposing the statute was the Polish nobility, which viewed such inconsistencies as unconstitutional, particularly since the Union of Lublin stipulated that no law could conflict with the law of the Union. The statute, however, in turn, declared the laws that conflicted with itself to be unconstitutional. Statutes of Lithuania were also used in territories of Lithuania annexed by Poland shortly before the Union of Lublin. These conflicts between statutory schemes in Lithuania and Poland persisted for many years.

The third variant of the Statute had particularly many humane features, such as: double compensations for killing or hurting a woman; prohibition to enslave a free man for any crime; freedom of religion; and a recommendation to acquit the accused when there is a lack of evidence, instead of punishing the innocent. It was in force in the territory of Lithuania until 1840 when it was replaced by the Russian laws. Until then, many Russian peasants and even nobles (e.g., Andrey Kurbsky) were fleeing from despotism in the neighboring Tsardom of Russia to Lithuania.

The Third Statute consisted of 14 chapters:

 Chapter 1. "O parsune nasshoj gospodarskoj" (On the status of Grand Duke of Grand Duchy of Lithuania).
 Chapter 2. "O oborone zemskoj" (On advocacy).
 Chapter 3. "O volnostyah shlyahetskih i o rozmnozhen'yu Velikogo Knyazstva Litovskogo" (On noble privileges and on the development of the Grand Duchy of Lithuania). 
 Chapter 4. "O sud'yah i sudeh" (On the judges and courts of law).
 Chapter 5. "O oprave posagu i o vene" (On inheritance).
 Chapter 6. "O opekah" (On trustees)
 Chapter 7. "O zapiseh i prodazheh" (On the conduct of business and taxes).
 Chapter 8. "O testamentah"(On testaments).
 Chapter 9. "O podkomoryh v poveteh i o pravah zemlenyh o granicah i mezhah" (On the local government and land ownership).
 Chapter 10. "O puschu, o lovy, o derevo bortnoe, o ozera i senozhaty" (On the use of land resources: hunting, fishing, honey hunting, etc.).
 Chapter 11. "O kgvalteh, o boeh, o golovschinah shlyahetskih" (On violations, fights and punishments of Szlachta)
 Chapter 12. "O golovschineh i o navezkah lyudej prostyh i o takih lyudeh i chelyadi, kotoraya ot panov svoih othodit, takzhe o slugah prikaznyh" (On the rights and punishments of servants and non-aristocracy).
 Chapter 13. "O grabezhah i navezkah" (On theft and robberies).
 Chapter 14. "O zlodejstve vsyakogo stanu" (On various frauds and wrong doings).

Implications and developments

Copies of the statutes used to be kept in each powiat (district) so they could be used and seen by each person desiring to do so.

Attempts by the Lithuanian nobility to limit the power of Lithuanian magnates led to the equalization of laws movement, culminating in the reforms of the election sejm of 1697 (May–June), confirmed in the coronation sejm of September 1697 in the document Porządek sądzenia spraw w Trybunale Wielkiego Księstwa Litewskego. These reforms limited the jurisdiction and competency of several Lithuanian offices, such as those of the hetman, kanclerz (chancellor), marszałek (marshal) and podskarbi (under-treasurer), to equate them with those of the corresponding offices in the Polish crown. Many of these offices at the time were held by members of the Sapieha family, and the changes were at least partly made with a view to reducing their power. The reforms also instituted Polish as the administrative language, replacing Ruthenian, in written documents and court proceedings, contradicting the wording of the Third Statute.

The Statutes of Lithuania were a sign of the progressive European legal tradition, and were cited as precedent in Polish and Livonian courts. Furthermore, they had a major influence on the 1649 encoding of the Russian legal code, Sobornoye Ulozheniye. After forming an association with Poland—including both the dynastic union (1385–1569) and the confederated Polish–Lithuanian Commonwealth (1569–1795)—the Lithuanian Statutes were the Grand Duchy's greatest expression of independence.

In 1791, efforts were made to change the system and do away with the privileges of the nobility, creating a constitutional monarchy with a modern citizenry (see Constitution of 3 May). However, these plans came to naught when Russia, abetted by Austria and Prussia, partitioned the Commonwealth, although leaving the Lithuanian Statutes in effect in Lithuania until 1840.

See also
 Law of Lithuania
 Old Russian Law

References

External links

 1529 Statute Original (Polish)
 1588 Statute Original (Ruthenian) Archived 5 Jul 2018

16th century in law
16th century in Belarus
16th century in Lithuania
16th century in Poland
16th century in Ukraine
Medieval Belarus
Church Slavonic manuscripts
Early Modern history of Belarus
Legal codes
Legal history of Poland
Legal history of Lithuania
Legal history of Belarus
Legal history of Ukraine
Belarusian language
Ruthenian language